Because of Lebanon's unique geography, both summer and winter sports thrive in the country. In fact, during autumn and spring it is sometimes possible to engage in both activities on the same day; for example, skiing in the morning and swimming in the afternoon.

Lebanon hosted the Asian Cup in 2000 and the Pan-Arab Games in 1957 and again in 1997. In December 2011, Lebanon gained acceptance to host the 13th Pan-Arab Games in 2015. Although the Asian Winter Games were under consideration to be held in Lebanon in 2009, they ultimately did not take place. However, Lebanon did host Les Jeux de la Francophonie in 2009.

Autosports

Rally

Rally of Lebanon, which is organized by the Automobile et Touring Club du Liban (ATCL), has been a popular sport in Lebanon since the late 1960s. It is the only tarmac rally of the MERC.

Grand Prix
In 2001, Solidere revealed plans to build a racing circuit in the Beirut Central District in a bid to stage Formula One races in Lebanon. The plan was to make the Beirut Formula One the only in-city Grand Prix outside Monaco. The plans never saw fruition. However, Lebanon entered the world of international motor sport in 2004 with the formation of the Lebanese A1 Grand Prix team that included driver Basil Shaaban, making Lebanon the first Arab nation to participate in the World Cup of Motorsport.

Athletics

Jogging
Jogging is a popular sport, especially in the capital along the Corniche Beirut, in the Horsh Beirut and the Shoreline Walk in Beirut Central District. Outside Beirut, jogging is practiced at the Marina Joseph Khoury in Dbayeh and along the corniches of Tripoli, Tyre and Sidon.

Marathons

The Beirut International Marathon (BIM) has been an annual, international event since 2003. It is held every fall, drawing top runners from Lebanon and abroad. Shorter races are also held for youth and less serious competitors. Race day is promoted as a fun, family event, and it has become a tradition for many to participate in costumes or outlandish clothing.

Bodybuilding
Bodybuilding is a popular sport in Lebanon. Bodybuilders like George Farah, Samir Bannout, Fouad Abiad and Mohammad Bannout, won international competitions. Edward Michel Kaouk was another Lebanese bodybuilder who won the Championship of Arabs and the Middles East in 1979, the Paris Amateur Bodybuilding Championship in 1980, and the World Amateur Bodybuilding Championship the same year. Malih Alaywan, IFBB Patron and once IFBB's vice president for the Middle East and, is credited with creating support for bodybuilding in Lebanon and the Arab world.

Combat Sports

Greco-Roman wrestling
Khalil Taha was a bronze medal winner in the 1952 Helsinki Olympics in Greco-Roman wrestling, while Zakaria Chihab won the silver. In 1980, Hassan Bechara won the bronze medal at the 1980 Summer Olympics in Moscow.

Martial arts
Martial arts are also popular combat sports in Lebanon.

Equine sports
The Beirut Hippodrome, a horse-racing facility built in 1885, is once again operating and regaining its former popularity after years of neglect during the war. Additionally, private clubs have been established in Lebanon, such as The Lebanese Equestrian Club (CHL) also known as Club Hippique Libanais, the Buldozer

Mountain sports
Hiking, trekking and mountain biking are popular sports in the summer when ski lifts can be used to access some of Lebanon's best trails, with panoramic views stretching as far as Cyprus to the west and Syria to the east. The Lebanon Mountain Trail is Lebanon's first national long-distance hiking trail that covers 440 km and passes through 75 villages, starting in the north and trecking over the spine of Mount Lebanon until it terminates in the south of Lebanon. The Baskinta Literary Trail, a 24-km long, offers hikers a chance to discover 22 literary landmarks related to several acclaimed, Lebanese literary figures. Cross-country running, rock climbing, and caving are also sports practiced across Mount Lebanon.

Racquet sports

Tennis
According to the 13th century French tale, L'histoire d'Apollonius de Tyr, the Stoic philosopher and Phoenician king, Apollonius of Tyre was the oldest tennis player and champion on record, albeit fictional. In reality, Lawn tennis did not come to Lebanon until 1889 when it was first introduced in the village of Brummana. Ainab was also one of the first villages in Lebanon to have a tennis court, which was built by five professors from the American University of Beirut early in the 20th century. The annual tennis tournament, which was an international event prior to the war, but now mostly a national one, is held at Brummana High School in August.

Table tennis :
Www.lttf.com.lb

Team sports

Association football

Football is the most popular sport in Lebanon. It is governed by the Lebanese Football Association (LFA). The country's most supported clubs are Nejmeh and Ansar, with Ahed gaining popularity in recent years.

While the national team has never qualified for the FIFA World Cup, they have participated in the 2000 AFC Asian Cup, as hosts, and in the 2019 AFC Asian Cup, their first participation through regular qualification. In the 2019 edition, they narrowly missed out on the knock-out stages by the fair-play rule. They are also regular participants at the WAFF Championship, a football tournament for countries that are part of the West Asian Football Federation. Lebanon has finished third once in the Arab Nations Cup, twice in the Pan Arab Games, and once in the Mediterranean Games, in all four instances as hosts.

The top division of the Lebanese football league system is the Lebanese Premier League, in which twelve teams compete. Cup competitions include the Lebanese FA Cup, the national domestic cup competition, the Lebanese Super Cup, held between the winner of the league and the FA Cup, the Lebanese Elite Cup, in which the top six teams of the previous league season compete, and the Lebanese Challenge Cup, for the bottom six teams.

In 2005, Nejmeh became the first team from Lebanon to reach the final of the AFC Cup. However, they lost to Al-Faisaly 4–2 on aggregate. After beating April 25 in the final of the 2019 AFC Cup, Ahed became the first Lebanese team to win the competition.

Basketball

Basketball is one of the most popular sports in Lebanon. In basketball, the main federation is the Lebanese Basketball Federation it's a member of FIBA Asia. The first time basketball was played was in the mid-1920s. The Lebanon national basketball team has qualified three consecutive times to the FIBA World Championship in 2002, 2006, 2010 and ranked 24th in the world and the women national team is ranked 61st in the world. Lebanon owns its own basketball league: Lebanese Basketball League for men and women in addition to the Lebanese Basketball Cup. The most successful Lebanese basketball clubs are Sporting Beirut and Sagesse for men and Antranik SC for women.

Very famous basketball players include:
From Lebanon: Fadi El Khatib and Elie Mechantaf
From the Lebanese diaspora: Rony Seikaly, Brian Beshara and Matt Freije
Naturalized Lebanese players from the United States: Joe Vogel and Jackson Vroman

Futsal
The Lebanese play mini football which is very similar or identical to futsal. The Lebanon national futsal team represents Lebanon in international futsal competitions and is controlled by the Futsal Commission of the Federation Libanaise de Football Association. It is one of the rising teams in Asia. In December 2007, Lebanon ranked 34 in the Futsal World Ranking, the sixth highest ranking Asian team that year.  In 2010, Lebanon ranked 41 and in 2011, the country ranked 48.

Rugby league

Rugby league is a popular sport in Lebanon. The Lebanese Rugby League Federation is based in Safra in Lebanon. They are Full Members of the Rugby League European Federation and also Full Members of the Rugby League International Federation. The Lebanon national rugby league team qualified and played in the 2000 Rugby League World Cup, and nearly qualified for the 2008 Rugby League World Cup, but were narrowly beaten by Samoa in their final game. In 2011, Lebanon again nearly qualified for the 2013 Rugby League World Cup but lost to Italy who became the 14th and final nation to qualify for the event. In 2015 however they finally qualified for the 2017 Rugby League World Cup, for what was just their second World Cup, after beating South Africa 2–0 in a 2-match qualifying play-off held in Pretoria. The Lebanon Rugby League ("LRL") National Championship is the leading domestic rugby league competition in Lebanon, and consists of 4 clubs (Tripoli City RLFC, Immortals RLFC, Jounieh RLFC and Wolves FC). The second tier of competition, known as the Collegiate Rugby League ("CRL") National Championship, consists strictly of teams representing Lebanese universities and institutes of higher learning.  The CRL is divided into two Divisions based upon longevity & success of the institution's Rugby League programme, and the CRL: Playoffs converge into a single CRL Finals Series.  Rugby League is popular amongst Lebanese schools, with regional Schools Rugby League ("SRL") championships held in "North Lebanon" and also in "Beirut & Mount Lebanon" regions, where the winners (aka: "Premiers") of each region face off to be crowned the "National Champion"; contested at both U14s and U16s level. Lebanon has also sent schools to compete in regional international schools tournaments, and has hosted junior international sides from throughout the Middle East/North Africa region.

Rugby union

Rugby union in Lebanon dates back to the French colonial period.

Touch football
Touch Football is a popular sport in Lebanon. In 1998, Lebanese Australians founded the Lebanon Touch Football Association.  Since Lebanon's international debut in 1999 they have qualified for the 1999 World Cup in Australia where the Men's O30's won silver, Mixed Open won bronze and Men's Open came 5th. In the 2001 Youth World Cup in New Zealand the Lebanese Men's U18's team finished 4th and Men's U20's came 6th. In the 2005 Youth World Cup in Australia the Men's U20's defeated South Africa to win the bronze medal. In the 2007 World Cup in South Africa the Men's Opens team defeated Japan to win the bronze medal. Lebanon is currently ranked third in the world behind Australia and New Zealand.

Volleyball
Volleyball has some popularity in Lebanon where there is a professional volleyball league. This team sport was introduced to Lebanon through foreign schools after the First World War in 1918. In the 1920s, it spreads widely in some schools, namely the Sacré Coeur, Al Makassed and La Sagesse and in some universities such as the Saint Joseph University (USJ) and the American University of Beirut (AUB). In 1973, the Lebanese government signed a sport's cooperation treaty with the USSR to have Soviet coaches train the Lebanese national volleyball team. Lebanon has competed in numerous international volleyball events. In 1952, Israel defeated Lebanon 3–0 and then lost to Lebanon 3–2 in the World Volleyball Championships in Moscow. Beach volleyball is also practiced in Lebanon.

Water sports
Swimming, water skiing, yachting, sailing, scuba diving, and windsurfing are practiced along the Mediterranean coast of Lebanon, especially on that stretch between Beirut and Tripoli.

Diving
Diving is a popular sport in Lebanon with interesting wrecks to explore. The air temperatures is above  from May through October, which along with its unexplored waters along the 180 miles coastline, Lebanon has a lot to offer visiting divers.

Water skiing
Lebanese water skier Silvio Chiha snagged the gold medal at the Asia-Australasia Oceania (AAO) water skiing championship that happened in August 2012 in Chuncheon, South Korea, the state-run National News Agency reported. [DailyStar]

The final ranking of the competition came as follows:
1-Silvio Chiha (Lebanon)
2- Cha Bum-Kun (South Korea)
3-Josh Briant (Australia)
4-Kim Don John (South Korea)
via LBC

An international water ski championship was held in the Saint George Bay in Beirut, beginning in 1955, but the event was discontinued at the beginning of the war.

 Fishing
 Jet skiing
 Sailing
 Snorkeling
 Wind surfing

Wake boarding

Weightlifting
Since the mid-20th century, weightlifting has been one of the biggest success stories for Lebanese athletes who have participated in numerous international competitions. In the 1972 Summer Olympics in Munich, Mohamed Traboulsi won the silver medal, in addition to many gold medals in continental and regional championships.

Winter sports

Lebanon boasts six ski resorts, with slopes suitable for skiers and snowboarders of all ages and levels of experience. Off-slope, there are many opportunities for cross-country skiing, snowshoeing, and snowmobiling.

Skiing

See also
 Rangers Sports Events (Lebanon)
 Lebanon at the Olympics

References